Abganerovo is the name of several rural localities in Russia:
Abganerovo, Oktyabrsky District, Volgograd Oblast, a selo in Abganerovskoe Rural Settlement of Oktyabrsky District in the Volgograd Oblast
Abganerovo, Svetloyarsky District, Volgograd Oblast, a selo in Abganerovskoe Rural Settlement of Svetloyarsky District in the Volgograd Oblast